Bettis Atomic Power Laboratory is a U.S. Government-owned research and development facility in the Pittsburgh suburb of West Mifflin, Pennsylvania, that works exclusively on the design and development of nuclear power for the U.S. Navy. It was one of the leaders in creating the nuclear navy.

The laboratory is part of the Naval Nuclear Propulsion Program, a joint U.S Navy-Department of Energy program responsible for the research, design, construction, operation and maintenance of U.S. nuclear-powered warships.

The laboratory was founded in 1949 on the site of the former Bettis Field, named after Cyrus Bettis. From the Lab's founding until 1998, it was run by Westinghouse Electric Corporation. Bechtel Corporation won the contract to run the laboratory on September 19, 2008 and assumed operation on February 1, 2009, first under its subsidiary Bechtel Bettis, Inc., later under Bechtel Marine Propulsion Corporation. The contract changed hands again when Fluor Corporation, as their subsidiary Fluor Marine Propulsion, LLC won the contract to run the laboratory on July 12, 2018 and assumed operations on October 1, 2018. 

The laboratory developed Oak Ridge National Laboratory's original design of the pressurized water reactor (PWR) for operational naval use.

Westinghouse's Nuclear Power Division adapted the PWR design for commercial use and built the first commercial nuclear power plant in the United States, the Shippingport Power Plant in the west hills of Pittsburgh.

The laboratory had two supercomputers listed on the 26th TOP500 List (November 2005). Ranked 97 a 1,090 processor Opteron system and ranked 405 a 536 processor Itanium 2 system.

The laboratory is also home to the U.S. Navy's Bettis Reactor Engineering School. The school provides a post-graduate certificate program in nuclear engineering with a focus on nuclear reactor design, construction, and operations. It is open only to naval personnel and Bettis engineers.

The laboratory had been chosen to develop the Project Prometheus nuclear power source for the JIMO (Jupiter Icy Moons Orbiter) project, however, funding for this program was cancelled in the fall of 2005.

References

Sources

External links 
 U.S. DOE's Bettis Atomic Power Laboratory site
 Bechtel Bettis' Bettis Laboratory site

Bechtel
Nuclear research institutes
United States Department of Energy national laboratories
Economy of Pittsburgh
Research institutes in Pennsylvania
Science parks in the United States